Thomas Töpfer (born 27 May 1958, in Saalfeld) is a retired East German footballer who played as a midfielder.

External links
 
 

1958 births
Living people
East German footballers
Association football midfielders
FC Carl Zeiss Jena players
People from Saalfeld
Footballers from Thuringia